Logan's Run is a 1976 American science fiction action film directed by Michael Anderson and starring Michael York, Jenny Agutter, Richard Jordan, Roscoe Lee Browne, Farrah Fawcett, and Peter Ustinov. The screenplay by David Zelag Goodman is based on the 1967 novel Logan's Run by William F. Nolan and George Clayton Johnson. It depicts a utopian future society on the surface, revealed as a dystopia where the population and the consumption of resources are maintained in equilibrium by killing everyone who reaches the age of 30. The story follows the actions of Logan 5, a "Sandman" who has terminated others who have attempted to escape death and is now faced with termination himself.

Produced by Metro-Goldwyn-Mayer, the film uses only the novel's two basic premises: that everyone must die at a set age, and that Logan and his companion Jessica attempt to escape while being chased by another Sandman named Francis. Its filming was marked by special-effects challenges in depicting Carrousel and innovative use of holograms and wide-angle lenses.

The film won a Special Academy Award for its visual effects and six Saturn Awards, including Best Science Fiction Film. A spin-off TV series aired in 1977–1978 on CBS for 14 episodes.

Plot
In the year of the city 2274, the remnants of human civilization live in a sealed city contained beneath a cluster of geodesic domes, a utopia run by a computer that takes care of all aspects of life, including reproduction. The citizens live a hedonistic lifestyle but, to prevent overpopulation, everyone must undergo the rite of "Carrousel" when they reach the age of 30. There, they are killed under the guise of being "renewed". To track this, each person is implanted at birth with a "life-clock" crystal in the palm of the left hand that changes color as they get older and begins blinking as they approach their "Last Day". Most residents accept this chance for rebirth, but those who do not and attempt to flee the city are known as "Runners". An elite team of policemen known as "Sandmen", outfitted in predominantly black uniforms, are assigned to pursue and terminate Runners as they try to escape.

Logan 5 and Francis 7 are both Sandmen. After terminating a Runner, to whose presence they were alerted during a Carrousel rite, Logan finds an ankh among his possessions. Later that evening, he meets Jessica 6, a young woman also wearing an ankh pendant. Logan takes the ankh to the computer, which tells him that it is a symbol for a secret group whose members help the Runners find "Sanctuary", a mythic place where they will be safe to live out the rest of their lives.

Logan learns that the Sandmen have lost 1,056 Runners this way. The computer instructs Logan to find Sanctuary and destroy it, a mission which it code names "Procedure 033-03", which he must keep secret from the other Sandmen. Then, the computer changes the color of his life clock to flashing red, suddenly making him four years closer to Carrousel. Scared, he asks if the four years will be restored to him when his mission is completed but receives no response. In order to escape this, Logan is now forced to become a Runner. Logan meets Jessica and explains his intention to run. They meet with the underground group that leads them to the periphery of the city.

Logan learns that the ankh symbol is actually a key that unlocks an exit from the city. They come out into a frozen cave, with Francis following closely behind. In the cave, they meet Box, a robot designed to capture food for the city from the outside. Logan discovers, to his horror, that Box also captures escaped Runners and freezes them for food. Before Box can freeze Logan and Jessica, they escape, causing the cave to collapse on the robot.

Once outside, Logan and Jessica notice that their life clocks are no longer operational. They see the Sun for the first time and discover that the remains of human civilization have become a wilderness. They explore an old, seemingly abandoned city which was once Washington, D.C. In the ruins of the United States Senate chamber, they discover an elderly man living with many cats. His appearance is a shock to them, since neither has ever seen anyone over the age of thirty. The old man recounts what he remembers about what happened to humanity outside the city, and Logan realizes that Sanctuary has always been a myth.

However, Francis has followed them and he and Logan fight. Logan fatally wounds Francis; as he dies, Francis sees that Logan's life clock is now clear and assumes Logan has renewed. Logan and Jessica persuade the old man to return to the city with them as proof that life exists outside the domed city. Leaving the man outside, the two enter the city via an underwater tunnel and try to convince everyone that Carrousel is a lie and unnecessary. The two are captured by other Sandmen and taken to the computer, which interrogates Logan about Procedure 033-03 and asks if he completed his mission.

Logan insists, "There is no Sanctuary". What he had found was "old ruins, exposed", "an old man", and that the missing Runners were "all frozen”. 
These answers are not accepted by the computer, even after scanning Logan's mind, and the computer overloads, causing the city's systems to fail violently and release the exterior seals. Logan, Jessica, and the other citizens flee the ruined city. Once outside, the citizens see the old man, the first human they have met who is older than thirty, proving that they can, indeed, live their lives much longer.

Cast

 Michael York as Logan 5
 Richard Jordan as Francis 7
 Jenny Agutter as Jessica 6
 Roscoe Lee Browne as Box (voice)
 Farrah Fawcett-Majors as Holly 13
 Michael Anderson Jr. as Doc
 Peter Ustinov as Old Man
 Randolph Roberts as 2nd Sanctuary Man
 Lara Lindsay as The Woman Runner (and the uncredited voice of the City computer)
 Gary Morgan as Billy
 Ashley Cox as Timid Girl.

Production

Development
MGM's early attempts to adapt the book led to development hell. Producer George Pal's attempt was troubled in 1969 by competing views of what the film's story should be, including the possibility of incorporating symbolism of real life issues, in comparison to screenwriter Richard Maibaum's vision.

Rewriting Maibaum's screenplay would have taken between two and three months, and the budget would have had to have been reassessed. Pal became concerned the delays would cause the film to miss the wave of success science fiction was enjoying with 2001: A Space Odyssey and Planet of the Apes in 1968.

American International Pictures offered to buy Pal's projects, including Logan's Run, for $200,000, but MGM declined, only willing to accept a minimum of $350,000. Pal left the project to produce Doc Savage: The Man of Bronze (1975) for Warner Bros.

Saul David assumed responsibility in 1974, with Soylent Green author Stanley R. Greenberg assigned to write. Greenberg devised the idea of Carrousel, but afterwards dropped off the project. David Zelag Goodman wrote a nearly completely new screenplay, raising the age of death from 21 to 30 to allow for more actors to be considered for casting.

Casting
York, Agutter, and William Devane were cast in the lead roles, with Devane announced to play an "elite" Sandman in May 1975. Devane withdrew from the project and replaced Roy Thinnes in Alfred Hitchcock's 1976 film Family Plot.

Richard Jordan stepped in for Devane and was best known for his performances in Lawman (1971), Chato's Land (1972), Rooster Cogburn (1975) and the 1976 TV mini-series Captains and the Kings. York had previously appeared in Cabaret (1972), The Three Musketeers (1973) and Murder on the Orient Express (1974), while Agutter was best known for The Railway Children (1970) and Walkabout (1971). York and Agutter were 33 and 23 respectively, casting made justifiable by Goodman raising the age of death to 30.

In September 1975, it was announced Peter Ustinov would play "the last man alive in Washington, D.C." in the film. Farrah Fawcett has a small role, but her rising celebrity in television earned her a prominent credit (as Farrah Fawcett-Majors).

Filming
Special effects artists L. B. Abbott and Glen Robinson regarded Carrousel as the most difficult part of the film to portray, requiring hidden wires to depict the levitation. For the scene in which  Logan is interrogated by the Deep Sleep central computer, it was decided that genuine holograms would be most convincing, with Saul David advocating a new hologram effect be created. The robot character Box was portrayed by placing actor Roscoe Lee Browne in a robot costume.

 The filmmakers also made use of wide-angle lenses not generally available. It became the first film to use Dolby Stereo on 70 mm prints. Nine entire sound stages were used at MGM in Culver City, California, hosting a miniature city among the largest of its kind built to date.

Producers saved $3 million by finding readily available locations in numerous Dallas buildings, including the Apparel Mart at Dallas Market Center (The Great Hall), Oz Restaurant and Nightclub (The Love Shop) and Pegasus Place (Sandman headquarters), the Fort Worth Water Gardens, and the Hyatt Regency Hotel in Houston. The Sewage Disposal Plant in El Segundo, California was used for the underground escape sequences.

Post-production
Post-production took eight months, including completion of the score. The score was composed and conducted by Jerry Goldsmith, with orchestrations by Arthur Morton. The score "adheres to two distinct sound palettes: strings, keyboards and abstract electronics only for cues inside the City and full orchestra for outside". The first release of portions of the score was on MGM Records on LP, in 1976. The complete expanded and newly remixed score was issued on CD in January 2002 by Film Score Monthly.

The film was previewed for test audiences prior to its release. A few sequences were edited or shortened as a result. These included a longer sequence in the ice cave, where Box asked Logan and Jessica to pose for his ice sculpture. This was cut due to extensive nudity so that the film could receive a PG rating (PG-13 did not exist yet) and for length. Other scenes were removed, including a sequence where Francis hunts down a runner by himself at the beginning of the film. Other sequences were trimmed to include a "... knock-down drag out fight" scene between Jessica and Holly 13. Some of these scenes are featured as extras in the 1998 DVD release. Other scenes survive in the shooting script, but the footage appears lost. At the end of the process, the budget had escalated from the projected $3 million to $9 million, an expensive film for 1976. It was noted for being the most expensive MGM film made in 10 years, with most of the budget going to the sets.

Themes
Logan's Run explores utopian and dystopian themes, with the idea that characters willingly die instead of reaching advanced ages, reflecting the idea that "utopias require its participants to give something up in order to create harmony and uniformity". Common dystopian themes include an evil ruling authority, the confiscation of children from parents, life in a city, and the idea of human overpopulation, in this case causing the protagonists to leave the urban environment.

Prominent concepts in the film are "the dangers of hedonism, youth worship, and, particularly, the dangers of government-sponsored euthanasia". The hedonism is primarily conveyed in the form of sensuality and "images of sexual abandon". Aside from sexual freedom, the pursuit of pleasure is also reflected in how this was envisioned in the 1970s, including miniskirts, little career, relaxed gyms, and Farrah Fawcett's "shag" haircut. Author Barna William Donovan argues this serves to criticize many social developments underway in the 1970s, targeting the "Me generation". Writer Robert Tinnell hypothesizes the design of the city, reminiscent of a shopping mall, is also suggestive of "anticonsumerist sentiment". The film may ultimately serve as a warning against overthrowing older generations, aimed at young viewers following the counterculture movements in the 1960s.

Another interpretation is that individualism, the "freedom to live and be", is curbed by "social mechanisms" telling citizens to have a good life for only a limited time. Logan, originally part of an "artificial society" centred on "pleasure and spectacle", becomes "re-individualised" and defies a "conformist system". Despite the reflections of the 1970s, Donovan argues the film may also have relevance to the Internet age, with elements evocative of online dating.

Writers have also examined the film's statements on gender and race. At one point in the film, Logan asks Jessica whether she is a lesbian after she expresses no romantic interest in him. His casual, non-judgmental tone indicates homosexuality is no longer taboo in the film's futuristic society, a possible side effect of sex no longer being related to child bearing.  Ultimately, author Bonnie Noonan believes the idea of returning to the concept of "beloved wife" is a sign that in the story, women's liberation, and not technology, is at the root of the dystopia.

The character of Box, being voiced by African-American actor Roscoe Lee Browne, could serve as a precursor to Darth Vader, voiced by African-American actor James Earl Jones in Star Wars (1977), in "racializing cyberphobic primers available to Generation X".

Reception

Box office
In its first five days in theatres in 1976, Logan's Run grossed $2.5 million, a substantial sum at the time. The film finished its run with a gross of $25 million in North America, and a solid performance in other territories.

The film is credited with helping MGM recover from debt and was a hit with young audiences in particular.

Critical response
The film received a generally mixed response. Roger Ebert gave the film a three-star rating, calling the film a "vast, silly extravaganza", with a plot that's a "cross between Arthur C. Clarke's The City and the Stars and elements of Planet of the Apes" and "that delivers a certain amount of fun". Variety staff called the film "rewarding" in its escapism and intelligence.

Vincent Canby of The New York Times was less positive:

Just why and for what particular purpose Logan makes his run is anything but clear after you've sat through nearly two hours of this stuff. Logan's Run is less interested in logic than in gadgets and spectacle, but these are sometimes jazzily effective and even poetic. Had more attention been paid to the screenplay, the movie might have been a stunner.

Gene Siskel of the Chicago Tribune gave the film zero stars out of four, calling it "unquestionably the worst major motion picture I've seen this year". He described the technological gadgets as "lackluster" and the script "loaded with stupidities that had a preview audience laughing in derision". What he found "most contemptible is the way the film never justifies any of its characters' behavior. Jessica's subversive group doesn't do anything except hide in what looks like a boiler room. The main story of Logan's flight consists of a simple fistfight". He concluded, "Logan's Run is an artistic con job from beginning to end".

New York was also negative, writing that the film was "yet another of those tiresome world-after-the-holocaust bits" and "hardly a hop for your money". However, the review complimented York and Agutter as "gifted".

Charles Champlin of the Los Angeles Times was mixed, writing that "its visual razzle-dazzle ... propels Logan's Run past some foolish concocting, indifferent acting, slow pacing and uncertain toning".

In 2000, Ian Nathan wrote in Empire that the film "can't escape its '70s origins", but contains "warnings about decadence, ageism, and allowing technology and science to run riot, done to a disco groove". In his 2015 Movie Guide, Leonard Maltin gave the film two stars, finding the first half "dazzling" and the second "dreary". In 2015, Rolling Stone named it 27th among the 50 Best Sci-Fi Movies of the 1970s. The film has a 63% approval rating on Rotten Tomatoes, based on 35 reviews. The site's consensus reads: "Logan's Run overcomes its campier elements and undercooked plot with a bounty of rousing ideas and dashing sci-fi adventure". On Metacritic it has a score of 53% based on reviews from 9 critics, indicating "mixed or average reviews".

Accolades
At the Academy Awards, the film won a Special Academy Award for visual effects, tied with the 1976 remake of King Kong, indicating Logan's Run made its mark in visual and special effects that few previous science fiction films had the money for. Logan's Run was very popular at the Saturn Awards, winning the six awards, including Best Science Fiction Film. The film was also in competition for the Golden Prize at the 10th Moscow International Film Festival.

Legacy
Inspired by the film's success with young viewers, CBS and MGM Television paid Nolan $9 million to base a television series on the film. The resulting series, Logan's Run, starring Gregory Harrison and Heather Menzies, began with Logan and Jessica escaping the domed city, then showed them encountering various obstacles in their quest to find Sanctuary. The series debuted in September 1977, and ran for 14 episodes before being cancelled. MGM had also expressed interest in adapting Nolan's sequel novel Logan's World, but Saul David had opted to focus on the television series instead.

Marvel Comics published a short-lived comic book series in 1977, with George Pérez drawing five issues between January and May 1977, with "acceptable" sales. The comics adapted the film's story in five issues and briefly continued beyond. In his art, Pérez sought to follow the art direction of the film. The book was cancelled after issue #7 in July 1977.

A possible remake of the film, or second adaptation of the novel, has been under development since the mid-1990s by producer Joel Silver and Warner Bros., which owns the filming rights. Directors who have been attached to the remake since then include Skip Woods, Bryan Singer, Joseph Kosinski, Carl Erik Rinsch, Nicolas Winding Refn and Simon Kinberg. Screenwriters attached to the film, who in some cases wrote a screenplay, include Ethan Gross and Paul Todisco, Dan Harris, Christopher McQuarrie, Alex Garland, Andrew Baldwin, Ken Levine and Peter Craig. Various directors have stated that they wished to make a film adaptation that was closer to the novel than the original film had been; conversely, in 2015 the idea was floated to give the remake a female lead, based on the success of the female-driven dystopian Hunger Games and Divergent film series. In 2021, the blog Gizmodo speculated that the remake project was dead for the foreseeable future, after Silver, who had spearheaded the project throughout, resigned from his own production company in 2019.

In 2000, Roger Joseph Manning Jr. and Brian Reitzell released an electronica album called Logan's Sanctuary, conceived as the soundtrack for an imagined sequel to Logan's Run.

References

Notes

Bibliography

External links
 
 
 
 

1970s science fiction action films
1970s dystopian films
1976 films
Ageism in fiction
American science fiction action films
American science fiction adventure films
American dystopian films
1970s English-language films
Films adapted into comics
Films adapted into television shows
Films based on American novels
Films based on science fiction novels
Films based on works by George Clayton Johnson
Films directed by Michael Anderson
Films scored by Jerry Goldsmith
Films set in the 23rd century
Films set in the future
Utopian films
Films set in Washington, D.C.
Films shot in Dallas
Films shot in Fort Worth, Texas
Films shot in Houston
Films that won the Best Visual Effects Academy Award
Metro-Goldwyn-Mayer films
Overpopulation fiction
American post-apocalyptic films
United Artists films
1970s American films